Bárbara Chianca Timo (born 10 March 1991) is a Brazilian-born Portuguese judoka. She won a silver medal at the 2019 World Judo Championships. In 2021, she competed in the women's 70 kg event at the 2020 Summer Olympics in Tokyo, Japan. She won a gold medal at the 2023 Grand Prix Portugal.

In 2020, she competed in the women's 70 kg event at the European Judo Championships held in Prague, Czech Republic.

References

External links
 
 

1991 births
Living people
Sportspeople from Rio de Janeiro (city)
Brazilian female judoka
European Games medalists in judo
European Games silver medalists for Portugal
Judoka at the 2019 European Games
Portuguese female judoka
S.L. Benfica (martial arts)
Judoka at the 2020 Summer Olympics
Olympic judoka of Portugal
Portuguese people of Brazilian descent